Midway is an unincorporated area in Sussex County, Delaware, United States. It is located "midway" between Rehoboth Beach and Lewes along Delaware Route 1 at the intersection with Delaware Route 24. The community is part of the Salisbury, Maryland-Delaware Metropolitan Statistical Area.

Notes

External links

Unincorporated communities in Sussex County, Delaware
Unincorporated communities in Delaware